The 2012–13 Czech First League, known as the Gambrinus liga for sponsorship reasons, was the 20th season of the Czech Republic's top-tier football league. The defending champions were Liberec, who won their third Czech First League title the previous season.

A number of games were postponed due to adverse weather conditions. On 18 March the game between Jihlava and Mladá Boleslav was postponed due to heavy snow. A second game was postponed, before, on 10 May 2013, the match between Dukla Prague and Brno became the third match to be postponed, this time due to a waterlogged pitch.

Teams
Viktoria Žižkov and Bohemians 1905 were relegated to the 2012–13 Czech 2. Liga after finishing last and second to last, respectively, in the 2011–12 season. Žižkov therefore immediately returned to the second tier, while Bohemians left after a three-year spell in the top flight.

The relegated teams were replaced by 2011–12 2. Liga runners-up Jihlava and fourth placed Zbrojovka Brno, who were promoted in place of 2. Liga winners FK Ústí nad Labem, whose stadium did not satisfy league requirements. Brno thus returned to the top flight after a one-year absence. Jihlava, having last played in the top flight in the 2005–06 season, returned after a six-season absence.

Stadia and locations

Personnel and kits

Note: Flags indicate national team as has been defined under FIFA eligibility rules. Players may hold more than one non-FIFA nationality.

 1 According to current revision of List of Czech Football League managers

Managerial changes

Notes

League table

Results

Season statistics

Top scorers

See also
 2012–13 Czech Cup
 2012–13 Czech 2. Liga

References

External links
  

Czech First League seasons
Czech
1